TRAF-type zinc finger domain-containing protein 1 is a protein that in humans is encoded by the TRAFD1 gene.

Model organisms
   
Model organisms have been used in the study of TRAFD1 function. A conditional knockout mouse line, called Trafd1tm1a(EUCOMM)Wtsi was generated as part of the International Knockout Mouse Consortium program — a high-throughput mutagenesis project to generate and distribute animal models of disease to interested scientists.

Male and female animals underwent a standardized phenotypic screen to determine the effects of deletion. Twenty eight tests were carried out on homozygous mutant mice and two significant abnormalities were observed: abnormal spine curvature and atypical peripheral blood lymphocyte parameters.

References

Further reading

 
 
 
 
 
 

Genes mutated in mice